Acalypha australis, commonly known as Asian copperleaf, is a species of flowering plant in the family Euphorbiaceae native to eastern Asia.

Description
There are 1–3 female flowers and 5–7 male flowers per bract; the female flowers have three sepals, whereas the male flowers have four.

Distribution and ecology
The native distribution of A. australis covers all of China except Nei Mongol and Xinjiang provinces, and parts of Japan, Korea, Laos, the Philippines, eastern Russia and Vietnam. The species has also been introduced to New York, northern Australia (Queensland to Victoria) and eastern India.

References

External links

australis
Flora of temperate Asia
Flora of Indo-China
Flora of the Philippines
Plants described in 1753
Taxa named by Carl Linnaeus